The Verninskoye mine is one of the largest gold mines in Russia and in the world. The mine is located in Irkutsk Oblast. The mine has estimated reserves of 12.88 million oz of gold.

References 

Polyus (company)
Gold mines in Russia
Buildings and structures in Irkutsk Oblast